Gisèle Côté-Harper,  (born 1942) is a Canadian lawyer and professor. She is the 1995 recipient of the Pearson Medal of Peace for her work as a human rights activist. She is the first Francophone woman to receive such an honor.

Education 
She graduated from Université Laval (B.A. and LL.L.) and Harvard Law School (LL.M.).

Career 
Côté-Harper was appointed Queen's Counsel in 1987. She is a professor at the Faculté de droit de l'Université Laval, specializing in criminal law and human rights. In 1997, she was made an officer of the Order of Canada. Côté-Harper also served as board chair of the International Centre for Human Rights and Democratic Development.

In 1998, she was awarded the médaille du Barreau de Québec.

References

External links
 Pearson Medal of Peace - Gisèle Côté-Harper

1942 births
Living people
Lawyers in Quebec
Canadian legal scholars
Harvard Law School alumni
Officers of the Order of Canada
Academics in Quebec
Academic staff of Université Laval
Université Laval alumni
United Nations Human Rights Committee members
Canadian human rights activists
Women human rights activists
Canadian women lawyers
Canadian King's Counsel
Canadian officials of the United Nations
Women legal scholars